Mike Windt (born May 29, 1986) is a former American football long snapper. He played college football at Cincinnati.

College career
Windt had an outstanding three-year career (2007–09) at the University of Cincinnati. Windt played well in 395 career snaps for the Bearcats.

Professional career

Cincinnati Bengals
After going undrafted in the 2010 NFL Draft, Windt signed with the Cincinnati Bengals as a rookie free agent on April 24, 2010, he was later cut before the regular season.

San Diego / Los Angeles Chargers
Windt was signed by the San Diego Chargers on October 13, 2010. Windt becomes the Chargers' long snapper in 2010. David Binn, James Dearth and Ryan Neill were all on Injured-Reserve and Ethan Albright snapped in the Chargers' last two games. Windt is arguably most famous for snapping the direct snap and participating in the blocking on the fake punt by Eric Weddle in the 2013 season finale that propelled the Chargers' winning drive that got the team into the 2013-14 postseason.

On March 8, 2017, Windt signed a four-year, $4.41 million contract extension with the Chargers.

On August 20, 2019, after playing nine consecutive seasons with the Chargers, he was released in favor of Cole Mazza who was signed that offseason.

Personal life

Windt was originally born and raised in Cincinnati, Ohio. He attended Elder High School. He currently resides in San Diego, California with his wife. Windt also has an older brother and a younger sister.

References

External links
Cincinnati Bio
Chargers Bio

1986 births
Living people
Players of American football from Cincinnati
American football long snappers
Cincinnati Bearcats football players
Cincinnati Bengals players
San Diego Chargers players
Los Angeles Chargers players
Elder High School alumni